In retail systems, the cost price represents the specific value that represents unit price purchased. This value is used as a key factor in determining profitability, and in some stock market theories it is used in establishing the value of stock holding.

Forms
Cost prices appear in several forms, such as actual cost, last cost, average cost, and net realizable value.

Cost price
Cost price is also known as CP. cost price is the original price of an item. The cost is the total outlay required to produce a product or carry out a service. Cost price is used in establishing profitability in the following ways:
 
 Selling price (excluding tax) less cost results in the profit in money terms. 
 Profit / selling price (excluding tax) when expressed as a percentage produces (gross profit) or GP%.
 Expense / net sales yields a percentage that when used as the target margin will produce gross profit.

Actual cost
In calculating actual or landed cost, all expenses incurred in acquiring an item are added to the cost of items in order to establish what the goods actually cost. Additions usually include freight, duty, etc.

Last cost 
This is the actual value of the item when last purchased, normally expressed in units.

Average cost 
When new stock is combined with old stock, the new price often overstates the value of stock holding. The better method is to combine the total value of investment in stock, old and new, and divide by the total number of units to calculate the average cost. This is a very accurate method of establishing stock holding.

Moving average cost
Moving average cost (MAC) is a slight permutation of the above, with the average being calculated from the previous average and new price.

Net realizable value 
The net realizable value normally indicates the average value of an item in the marketplace. Often this cost is interchangeable with replacement cost.

Costs